The Western Kentucky Hilltoppers football program is a college football team that represents Western Kentucky University. The team competes at the NCAA Division I Football Bowl Subdivision level and represents the university as a member of Conference USA in the Eastern division. The 2002 team was the FCS national champion. The program has 13 conference championships (1 SIAA, 9 OVC, 1 Gateway, 2 Conference USA) and 6 FBS-level bowl game victories. The Hilltoppers play their home games at Houchens Industries–L. T. Smith Stadium in Bowling Green, Kentucky and the team's head football coach is Tyson Helton.

History

Early history (1908–1967)
Western Kentucky first fielded a football team in 1908 but did not start playing sanctioned games until the 1913 season. M.A. Leiper and Roy Manchester are the first noted coaches for WKU. The two men teamed up to coach the Hilltoppers for their inaugural season which solely consisted of a 20–0 win over Elizabethtown. J.L. Arthur then took over the program for three years from 1914 to 1916, coaching a total of 14 games, 6 of which were against Eastern Kentucky. From 1917 to 1919 the Hilltoppers didn't compete in football from due to World War I. In 1920, L. T. Smith, whose name bears the Hilltoppers' home stadium, took the reins and coached the team for two seasons. From 1922 to 1928, the Hilltoppers saw their first success as Coach E.A. Diddle took over the football program for seven seasons leading them to four winning seasons while also coaching the Western Kentucky Hilltoppers basketball team. Diddle, who was a dual-athlete himself, encouraged his players to participate in multiple sports so they could stay in shape. His first team set a school record for wins that would stand for 41 years and his last team claimed to be state champions.  When he retired from coaching football in 1928, Diddle posted a record of 38–24–2. The Hilltoppers outscored opponents 171–7 in Diddle's final year of coaching the program. After Diddle left the football program to focus on coaching basketball, WKU football went through a series of instability in coaching but also a series of 9 winning seasons. In 1929, Carl "Swede" Anderson took over as head coach leading the Hilltoppers to a 7–3 record before leaving to take the head coach job over the Kansas State freshman football team. In 1934, Carl Anderson returned for a second stint with the Hilltoppers where he served as head coach through the 1937 season posting a 24–9–3 record with wins over EKU in all four seasons. The Hilltoppers were very successful in this era posting an outstanding a 60–20–4 record. After Anderson left the hill once again, this time to be an assistant coach at Indiana, the Hilltoppers selected Gander Terry to lead the program. In their four seasons under Terry, the Hilltoppers went 25–9–3 beating rivals Middle Tennessee and Eastern Kentucky in every game they played. Terry left the program after the 1941 season following a 4–5–1 record, the Hilltopper's first losing season since 1925. Arnold Winkenhofer took over in 1942 coaching the Toppers for one season before the program was stopped from 1943 to 1945 due to World War II. In 1946, Jesse Thomas returned to the Hill for his second stint as head coach. Thomas only stuck around WKU two more seasons with much less success than his first go around posting a 5–10–2 record.

Jack Clayton provided some much-needed stability to the WKU football program where he served as head coach for 9 seasons. In 1949, after losing the first two games to start the season, Clayton started a freshman quarterback by the name of Jimmy Feix winning 5 of the last 7 games that season. By 1952, with Feix now in his senior year, Clayton coached WKU to their first Ohio Valley Conference championship, tied the school record for wins, and the school's first bowl appearance, winning 34–19 over Arkansas State in the Refrigerator Bowl, finishing the season 9–1. Feix became the first WKU football athlete ever to earn All-America honors after posting the highest pass completion percentage in the nation (.612). Under Clayton, the Hilltoppers posted a record of 50–33–2 before he left to coach at Northwestern Louisiana State College, his alma mater. Nick Denes, who was also a Western Kentucky Hilltoppers baseball head coach and for whom Nick Denes Field is named, coached WKU football for 11 seasons. In his time on the Hill, Denes compiled a 57–39–7 record for a .587 winning percentage. In 1963, Denes led the Hilltoppers to their second bowl game victory, defeating Coast Guard 27–0 in the Tangerine Bowl, a season where the Hilltoppers went 10–0–1 and set a new school record for wins. Denes retired after the 1967 season following a 42–19 win over Murray State.

Jimmy Feix (1968–1983)
After serving under Nick Denes as an assistant coach for all 11 seasons, Jimmy Feix was promoted to head coach. In his 16 seasons at the helm, Feix compiled an impressive 105–56–6 record (.6488). His 14 teams that competed in the Ohio Valley Conference went 67–28–2 (.701) in conference play. The Hilltoppers won six Ohio Valley Conference championships between 1970 and 1980. Feix became the most successful and longest-tenured coach in Western Kentucky football history while leading the Hilltoppers in a transition from NCAA Division II to NCAA Division I-AA (now FCS). In 1973, the Hilltoppers went undefeated in the regular season before competing in the first-year NCAA Division II championship playoffs. They made it to the championship game against Louisiana Tech coming up just short and finishing the season 12–1, setting a new school record for wins that still stands. In 1975, the Hilltoppers made the playoff field again advancing to the title game for the second time, but once again having to settle for runner-up honors finishing their season with an 11–2 record. Feix was named OVC Coach of the Year in 1973, 1978 and 1980 and remains the winningest football coach in WKU history. Feix coached 16 athletes who followed him on the list of WKU football All-Americans.

Dave Roberts (1983–1988)
Feix retired as head coach moving to work in Alumni Affairs for two years before taking over as Director of Athletics in 1986. In his vacancy, the Hilltoppers hired former Vanderbilt assistant Dave Roberts to be the head coach with hopes of continuing what Feix started. Roberts struggled through his first three seasons posting a record 10–22–1 before turning things around. In 1987 and 1988 Roberts took the Hilltoppers to the NCAA Division I-AA playoffs coming up short to rival EKU both years. After the 1988 season, Roberts left Western Kentucky for the Northeast Louisiana head coaching job. Though going 16–8 in his last two season, Roberts left with a 26–30–1 record becoming the first Hilltopper coach to leave with a losing record in over 60 years.

Jack Harbaugh (1989–2002)
Jack Harbaugh served as the Hilltoppers head football coach for 14 seasons, compiling a 91–68 record, three 10+ win seasons, two conference championships (OVC 2000, Gateway 2002) and the 2002 Division I-AA National Championship. Harbaugh took the Hilltopper football program from the depths of despair in the early 1990s to its best stretch since the legendary Jimmy Feix coached on the Hill. In 1992, WKU was on the verge of losing its football program after a state-mandated $6.1 million budget cut. Harbaugh was notified of the plans to shut down the program just before spring practice was about to begin. Having already made up his mind that he was not going to quit, he talked with his players left them a choice: accept defeat and leave, or fight to stay. Now known as the 1992 "Save the Program" team, every player decided to stay, fight, and work to save WKU football. While Harbaugh and the team did their part, former WKU quarterback, coach and athletics director at the time, Jimmy Feix, started an emergency fundraising campaign writing letters and making calls to former WKU players, urging them to buy season tickets. All the efforts paid off and on April 30, 1992, the WKU Board of Regents voted to allow football to stay but with a reduced budget. The Hilltoppers finished the 1992 season with a losing record of 4–6. As the budget remained tight over the next few years WKU managed an 8-3 record in 1993 before having back-to-back losing seasons.

No one ever doubted Harbaugh's ability to coach but he clearly needed better players. In 1994, with unwavering faith in their father, both of his sons, Jim Harbaugh and John Harbaugh, decided to help however they could. While still playing in the NFL, Jim joined the WKU football coaching staff as an NCAA-certified unpaid assistant which allowed him to recruit. John, on the other hand, was a coach at Cincinnati and could rely on his scouting services, deep contacts, and endless high school game footage to help out. Jim set out and started contacting recruits, his first being Willie Taggart, an All-American and four-year starter at quarterback for WKU. Jim also recruited future NFL players Rod Smart and Mel Mitchell to WKU as well as 17 players on the 2002 national championship team. The Hilltoppers went 7-4 in 1996 and returned to the NCAA Playoffs in 1997 behind the arm and legs of quarterback Willie Taggart, which started a long series of winning seasons. Jack and his wife Jackie are credited with saving the program which led to being honored in 2012 with naming rights to the stadium club at L. T. Smith Stadium. This was 20 years after the 1992 "Save the Program" season and 10 years after the 2002 championship season.

David Elson (2003–2009)

After serving on Harbaugh's coaching staff seven seasons, David Elson was promoted to head coach where he led the Hilltoppers for seven seasons. Elson's first four seasons as head coach were at the Division I-AA level (now FCS) where he picked up where Harbaugh left and posted four straight winning seasons, a record of 30–17, and two playoff berths. On Nov. 2nd, 2006, prior to the end of the season, WKU's Board of Regents voted in favor of moving from NCAA Division I-AA to NCAA Division I-A football (now FBS) and would be joining the Sun Belt Conference in all sports by 2009. The move allowed WKU to add 22 scholarships by 2009 and increase the overall football budget by an estimated $2.5 million by the time the transition was complete.

In 2007, the Hilltoppers began the transition to NCAA Division I FBS as Independents, considered a reclassifying school for both the 2007 and 2008 seasons due to NCAA rules. The Hilltoppers were not eligible to participate in a Sun Belt Conference Championship or a berth in a bowl game until the 2009 season. Knowing it wasn't going to be easy, and without the motivation of being eligible to compete for a championship, Elson and the Hilltoppers set two team goals that season; to win seven games and to go undefeated at home. Both goals required at least one win over an FBS team. If the Hilltoppers won seven games, they got rings. They were able to accomplish the first of those goals, going 7–5 that season as they beat long-time rival MTSU in Murfreesboro, but were unable to hold off Troy at home; both of which were FBS schools and members of the Sun Belt Conference. That win over MTSU in 2007 would be the last major win for the Hilltoppers under Elson. The 2008 season shed a truer light to the transition as the Hilltoppers went 2–10 with no wins over FBS opponents, only beating their two other long-time rivals and FCS-level opponents EKU and Murray State. Things only got worse for the Hilltoppers in 2009 after they finally became full members of the Sun Belt Conference. WKU lost every game that season, going 0–12, posting their worst record in school history. Elson was hopeful to survive the transition as he asked for patience in building the program, but on Nov. 9th, 2009, prior to the end of the season, athletic director, Wood Selig had enough and fired Elson. The Hilltoppers went 39–44 under Elson, going 9–27 in his final three seasons (1–26 against FBS opponents).

Willie Taggart (2010–2012)
WKU Quarterback Legend, Willie Taggart, returned to his alma mater as head football coach in 2010 after leaving his position as Stanford running backs coach, where he served under Jack Harbaugh's son Jim Harbaugh. In their first year under Taggart, coming off a winless season under Elson, WKU finally broke their 26-game losing streak with a 54–21 win at UL Lafayette. The Hilltoppers finished 2–10 that season. From there, Taggart is credited with getting WKU's football program back on track after posting back to back 7–5 regular seasons that included an upset of Kentucky in Lexington in 2012. That was Western Kentucky's first win over a SEC opponent in program history. Despite the surprising 7–5 record in 2011, a season in which the Hilltoppers went 7–1 in their final eight games, they were not invited to a bowl game. It wasn't until the following year, 2012, that the Hilltoppers were invited to their first FBS-level bowl game, the Little Caesar's Bowl.

On December 7, 2012, prior to their December 26th bowl game, Taggart left WKU to accept the head football coach position at South Florida. Lance Guidry, WKU's defensive coordinator was named interim head coach and led the Hilltoppers to their first bowl appearance as an FBS member. In a valiant but unsuccessful effort, WKU was defeated 21–24 by Central Michigan. Taggart, who started all four years as the Hilltoppers quarterback from 1995 to 1998 under Jack Harbaugh, ran a run-heavy West Coast style offense that helped develop leading rushers, Bobby Rainey and Antonio Andrews. Rainey was named Sun Belt Conference Offensive Player of the Year in 2010 and 2011 while Quanterus Smith won Sun Belt Defensive Player of the Year in 2012.

Bobby Petrino (2013)
Former Louisville, Atlanta Falcons and Arkansas head coach Bobby Petrino was hired as the new head football coach following Taggart's departure. In the news conference announcing Petrino's hiring in December 2012, athletic director Todd Stewart called it a "landmark moment" in the history of WKU football. Keeping the programs momentum going, on April 1, 2013, it was announced that WKU would join Conference USA in all sports effective July 1, 2014, the following season. In their first game under Petrino and to start the season, the Hilltoppers won their second straight game over SEC opponent Kentucky, playing at a neutral site in Nashville, Tennessee. The Hilltoppers finished the 2013 regular season 8–4, posting their best record since 2004, but were once again snubbed from a bowl appearance. In WKU's last season as members of the Sun Belt, Antonio Andrews won Sun Belt Conference Player of the Year and Offensive Player of the Year while Xavius Boyd won Sun Belt Conference Defensive Player of the Year. WKU became the first school in league history to sweep the top three honors with just two players. On January 8, 2014, it was announced that Petrino would leave WKU to return to Louisville to accept the head football coach position.

Jeff Brohm (2014–2016)

After one season as offensive coordinator for the Hilltoppers, Jeff Brohm was promoted to the program's head football coach, replacing Petrino. In their first season under Brohm and as members of Conference USA, WKU went 8–5. Highlights of the season include upsetting undefeated and No. 24 ranked Marshall, in Huntington, 67–66 in overtime (effectively starting a rivalry between the two schools) as well as winning the Popeyes Bahamas Bowl, their first FBS bowl win with a 49–48 victory over Central Michigan. Brohm is credited with developing leading quarterback Brandon Doughty who led the FBS in passing yards and passing touchdowns in 2014 with 4,830 yards and 49 touchdowns respectively. Doughty was named 2014 Sammy Baugh Trophy winner as well as 2014 Conference USA Most Valuable Player.

In 2015, Brohm led WKU to a ten-win regular season, highlighted by an undefeated conference record, WKU's first appearance in the top 25, and a Conference USA Championship beating Southern Miss 45–28. The Hilltoppers went on to defeat South Florida, who was coached by former Hilltopper quarterback and coach Willie Taggart, in the Miami Beach Bowl 45–35, ending the season with a 12–2 record and ranked 24th in the nation. Quarterback Brandon Doughty again led the FBS in passing yards with 5,055, and passing touchdowns with 48, but also led in pass completion percentage with 71.9 and total yards per play with 8.7. Doughty was named the C-USA Most Valuable Player for a second straight year becoming the first player in league history to win the award in back-to-back seasons. In 2016, Brohm led WKU to their second consecutive 10+ win season for the first time in school history and their second straight C-USA Football Championship title. WKU beat LaTech 58–44 in a revenge match becoming just the second team to repeat as C-USA champions in back-to-back years and the first team in C-USA to host the championship and win in back-to-back years.

On December 5, 2016 it was announced that Jeff Brohm would be leaving to take the head coach position at Purdue and that defensive coordinator Nick Holt would be filling in as interim head coach leading into their bowl game. Holt led the Hilltoppers to their 3rd straight bowl victory beating Memphis 51–31 in the Boca Raton Bowl finishing the season 11–3. In his three seasons as head coach Jeff Brohm posted an outstanding 30–10 record, 17–2 at home, and 20–5 against Conference USA opponents. With the bowl win under Coach Holt, that brought their total wins over three years to 31 becoming a dominant force in Conference USA and among the Group of Five.

Mike Sanford Jr. (2017–2018)
Leaving his job as offensive coordinator at Notre Dame, Mike Sanford returned to WKU, this time as head coach, after serving as quarterbacks coach under Willie Taggart in 2010. Sanford also served on the same coaching staff as Taggart under Jim Harbaugh at Stanford. During his first year at WKU, the team went 6–7, losing in the 2017 Cure Bowl to Georgia State, 27–17. After a string of losses to open the 2018 campaign, including a home loss to FCS-level Maine 31–28 (a game in which WKU had once held a 21–0 lead), WKU limped to a 3–9 finish. Despite winning their final two games, including a road upset of Louisiana Tech, WKU fired Mike Sanford on November 25, 2018. Mike Sanford finished his WKU tenure with a 9–16 record, and a 6–10 record against Conference USA opponents.

Tyson Helton (2019–present)
On November 26, 2018, WKU announced the hire of Tennessee offensive coordinator Tyson Helton as the new Hilltoppers head coach. Helton came back to WKU after formerly holding the role of OC at WKU in 2014–2015 under Jeff Brohm before he was hired by his brother Clay Helton as the quarterbacks coach at USC. In his first year as head coach, Helton was able to turn the program around and finished the season 8–4 including a statement 45–19 win over the Arkansas Razorbacks. In his first season, Helton won 2019 C-USA Coach of the Year. In addition to that honor, DeAngelo Malone won 2019 C-USA Defensive Player of the Year while Ty Storey won C-USA Newcomer of the Year. On December 8, WKU announced it would be accepting an invite to play in the SERVPRO First Responders Bowl in Dallas, TX against Western Michigan on December 30, 2019 and won 23-20.

Conference affiliations
 1913–1925: Independent
 1926–1942: Southern Intercollegiate Athletic Association
 1942–1945: Independent
 1946–1947: Kentucky Intercollegiate Athletic Conference
 1948–1981: Ohio Valley Conference
 1982–1998: NCAA Division I-AA independent
 1999–2000: Ohio Valley Conference
 2001–2006: Gateway Football Conference
 2007: NCAA Division I FCS independent
 2008: NCAA Division I FBS independent
 2009–2014: Sun Belt Conference
 2014–present: Conference USA

Head coaches
The following are the head coaches of the Western Kentucky Hilltoppers.

† Interim

Championships

National championships
WKU won the NCAA Division 1AA football national championship in 2002 and finished ranked number 1 in both final 1AA national polls that year.  They were NCAA Division 2 national runners-up in 1973 and 1975.

Conference championships
Western Kentucky has won 13 conference titles, ten outright and three shared. They were an I-AA football independent from 1982 through 1998 and again in 2007 and 2008 while transitioning from FCS to FBS.  Additionally, the 1928 team defeated all other Kentucky teams on its schedule and claimed to be state champions.

† Co-champions

Division championships 
In addition to conference championships, Western Kentucky has won 3 conference divisional titles.

† Co-champions

Bowl games
The Hilltoppers competed in two "College Division" bowl games prior to the NCAA instituting playoffs for lower division teams in 1973, with a record of 2–0.

WKU played in four bowl games that were part of the NCAA Division II postseason during the 1973 to 1977 timeframe, with a record of 2–2.

In 2009 WKU completed its transition from Division I-AA/FCS to FBS.  All bowl games since then have been at the NCAA Division I FBS level, with a record of 6–3.

NCAA Playoff appearances
The NCAA began Division II National Football Championship in 1973. WKU played in the NCAA Division II playoff championship game in 1973 and 1975. NCAA Division I-AA was formed for football in 1978, and WKU moved up from Division II to Division I-AA at that time, and all playoff appearances since then were at the Division I-AA level.  WKU won the Division 1AA NCAA championship in 2002. In 2006 the name of Division I-AA was changed to NCAA Division I Football Championship Subdivision (FCS). In 2007, WKU initiated the transition to NCAA Division I Football Bowl Subdivision (FBS) and became ineligible for any further playoff appearances. The Hilltoppers' overall playoff record is 12–9.

Logos and uniforms
Traditionally, the logo for Western Kentucky athletics was a diagonal "WKU" lettering. The primary logo was switched in 2003 to a red towel with an embossed "WKU" wordmark in white.

The Hilltoppers have a long relationship with Russell Athletic for their uniforms and the contract was renewed through 2016. Red and white are the primary colors of the football uniforms with an occasional gray or black uniform.

On August 13, 2016, WKU released 2 new (red home and white away) jerseys with 3 pants (red, white, and black.) The houndstooth design from legendary coach, Jimmy Feix's fedora is used on team shirts and down the stripe of the helmet. The university's cupola is inscribed on the chest plate and the line from the school's alma mater "We shall never fail thee" is written on the bottom of the jersey. On the pants, visibility of "Hilltoppers" lettering down the side of the pants increases with intensity of the game.

Hilltoppers in professional football

Current

Former

Notable Hilltopper players
Romeo Crennel – Former Defensive Coordinator for Houston Texans, Former Head Coach of the Kansas City Chiefs 2012, Cleveland Browns 2005–2008
Joe Bugel – Former Head Coach of the Oakland Raiders 1997
Willie Taggart – Current RBs Coach for Baltimore Ravens, former Head Coach of the FAU Owls, former Head Coach of the Florida State Seminoles, former Head Coach of the Oregon Ducks, former South Florida Bulls Head Coach, and former WKU Head Coach from 2010 to 2012, and played QB from 1995 to 1998
Eagle "Buddy" Keys – Former Head Coach in the CFL, Grey Cup Champion, member of the Canadian Football Hall of Fame
Rod Smart – Former running back for the Carolina Panthers and Las Vegas Outlaws (XFL). More famously known by the nickname "He Hate Me".
Jason Michael – QB of 2002 National Championship team, Current Offensive Coordinator for Tennessee Titans
Brandon Doughty – 2014 Sammy Baugh Award Winner and all-time passing leader at WKU
George Fant – Former Western Kentucky Hilltoppers basketball star and current offensive tackle for the New York Jets
Mike White – Quarterback for the New York Jets
Bailey Zappe – Quarterback for the New England Patriots

Notable Hilltopper coaches

Head coaches 

 L.T. Smith (1920–1921, Head Coach) – Namesake of L.T. Smith Stadium
 E.A. Diddle (1922–1928, Head Coach) – Legendary Western Kentucky Hilltoppers basketball Head Coach, symbol behind for WKU's red towel logo, and namesake of E. A. Diddle Arena
 Nick Denes (1957–1967, Head Coach) – Namesake of Nick Denes Field
 Jimmy Feix (1968–1983, Head Coach; 1957–1967, Assistant Coach; 1986–1991, Athletic Director) – Winningest coach in WKU history; 1973, 1978, and 1980 Ohio Valley Conference Coach of the Year; 1973 and 1975 NCAA Division II National Runners-up, and namesake of Feix Field in L.T. Smith Stadium.
 Jack Harbaugh (1989–2002, Head Coach) – 2000 Ohio Valley Conference Coach of the Year, 2002 AFCA Coach of the Year (FCS), 2002 FCS National Champion
 Bobby Petrino (2013) – Current Texas A&M Offensive Coordinator. Former coach at Missouri State, University of Louisville, University of Arkansas, and the NFL Atlanta Falcons spent 13 months as head coach at WKU before returning to Louisville in January 2014

Assistants 

 Tommy Prothro (1942, Assistant Coach) – Former Head Coach – Oregon State and UCLA, Former Head Coach – Los Angeles Rams and San Diego Chargers, member of the College Football Hall of Fame
 Jerry Glanville (1967, Defensive Coordinator) – Former NFL Head Coach of the Houston Oilers and the Atlanta Falcons
 Joe Bugel (1964–1968, Assistant Coach) – Former NFL Head Coach for the Arizona Cardinals and Oakland Raiders
 Romeo Crennel (1970–1974, Defensive Line Coach) – Former NFL Head Coach for the Cleveland Browns and Kansas City Chiefs
 Jim Harbaugh (1994–2001, Assistant Coach) – Former NFL Head Coach for the San Francisco 49ers and current Head Coach at the University of Michigan, was a certified, unpaid assistant under his father while playing in the NFL
 Don Martindale – (2001–03, LB Coach, Defensive Coordinator) Current Linebackers coach for the Baltimore Ravens

Retired jerseys
Western Kentucky has retired four jersey numbers.

Individual award winners

All-Americans
Five players have been designated by the NCAA as "Consensus All-Americans" as of 2017.

Rivalries
WKU has several historic rivalries that stem from its time in the Ohio Valley Conference. Since WKU's transition to the Football Bowl Subdivision in 2007, two of these rivalry games are no longer played on an annual basis.

Middle Tennessee State

100 Miles of Hate is the name of the long-standing rivalry with Middle Tennessee. As WKU's oldest rivalry the two programs played together for several decades in the Ohio Valley Conference before both became members of the Sun Belt Conference and then transitioned to Conference USA about the same time. The name comes from the fact that the two universities are separated by about 100 miles.

Eastern Kentucky

WKU has an inactive rivalry with Eastern Kentucky. The two programs have met 84 times in football since 1914. The rivalry has taken a hiatus since leaving EKU behind as WKU transitioned to FBS in 2009. The programs scheduled a one-game match-up in 2017 in which WKU won 31–17 in Bowling Green, KY.

Murray State

WKU has an inactive rivalry with nearby Murray State. The two programs have met 67 times since the rivalry began in 1931. The Red Belt trophy was introduced to the rivalry series in 1978 when Murray's athletic trainer failed to pack a belt for the Racers' road trip and was loaned one by legendary WKU athletic trainer Bill "Doc E" Edwards.

Future non-conference opponents
Announced schedules as of August 9, 2022.

References

External links

 

 
American football teams established in 1908
1908 establishments in Kentucky